Z-Tack is a 1983 space-themed non-scrolling shoot 'em up developed and published by Bomb for the Atari 2600. It was produced by Bomb, a video game label from developer Onbase Co. based out of Asia. Six different city-landscapes are included in the game. It received generally positive reviews from critics for its gameplay but also referring to it as a "cheap hack" or "clone" of  Atlantis.

Gameplay
The player is presented with an alien UFO-like spacecraft, which is tasked with reducing a city-scape within which there are certain number of bases that must be reduced to ruins before proceeding to the next level. The player must avoid missiles fired at them, which include heat-seeking-type missiles, as well as flying skulls. Six different city-scapes are included in the game. The game can be played in both single-player and two-player mode. As such it is essentially the reverse of Atlantis, a highly-popular game of the time, where a city must be defended.

Reception
Contemporary reviews of Z-Tack were mixed. In 1983, TV Gamer magazine described it as "probably the second-best video game to come from this new company, BOMB, the best being Assault" and as "[n]ot a world-beating game but well worth having a look". Videogaming Illustrated gave it good marks for gameplay (B,B+) but marked it down for lack-lustre graphics (C-,D). German magazine TeleMatch gave it 3/6 overall, describing it as a "relatively inexpensive shooting game" but criticising its lack of originality. The Australian magazine Score reviewed the game positively in their 1983 review, praising the "colourful" graphics and sound, though also noting that they were "simplistic".

Writing in 2018 in The A-Z of Atari 2600 Games: Volume 1, Kieran Hawken gave the game 7/10, praising particularly the graphics.

References

External links
Z-Tack at Atari Mania

1983 video games
Atari 2600 games
Atari 2600-only games
Video games developed in Japan